Paul Boyer may refer to:

 Paul Boyer (photographer) (1861–1908), French photographer
 Paul D. Boyer (1918–2018), American chemist and Nobel Prize winner
 Paul Boyer (historian) (1935–2012), American historian
 Paul Boyer (politician), American politician
 Paul Boyer, or sOAZ, (born 1994), French League of Legends player
 Paul Boyer (slavist) (1864–1949), French slavist